The 1982 United States Senate election in Massachusetts was held on November 2, 1982. Incumbent Democratic U.S. Senator Ted Kennedy won re-election to his fifth (his fourth full) term.

General election

Candidates
 Howard S. Katz (Libertarian)
 Ted Kennedy, incumbent U.S. Senator since 1962 (Democratic)
 Ray Shamie, metalwork entrepreneur (Republican)

Results

See also 
 1982 United States Senate elections

External links 
 1982 Congressional Election results

Massachusetts
1982
1982 Massachusetts elections